The Organization of Chinese American Women (abbreviated as OCAW) is a national nonprofit, nonpartisan organization dedicated to advancing the interests of Chinese American women in the United States and increasing awareness of issues affecting them. It was founded in 1977 by Pauline Tsui, and is headquartered in Washington, D.C. At first it was affiliated with the Organization of Chinese Americans, but it was regarded as an auxiliary rather than an equal partner, and the two groups had different priorities, so they broke apart in 1987. In contrast to the Organization of Chinese Americans, which is mainly a political advocacy group, the Organization of Chinese American Women primarily provides services and assistance to its members. It is supported by membership, private donations and public grants. Its mission statement reads "To advance and to advocate for the needs and concerns of Chinese and other Asian Pacific American women by helping to improve their educational, economic, social, and political opportunities, and by recognizing their excellence, leadership, and contributions to the quality of life."

OCAW sponsored scholarships for the Presidential Classroom Program in Washington, DC each year starting from 1980. Furthermore, they have joined with the Gates Millennium Scholars to create more scholarship opportunities for Chinese American students, and also work with the Tiger Woods Foundation to offer the OCAW Scholarships for Girls in Rural China. They also work to promote Chinese Americans in the arts through their involvement with Opera International and the Li Foundation. Recently, OCAW and the Center for Creative Leadership have joined together to create the Chinese-American Women's Leadership Program, a program meant to help strengthen Chinese American women's leadership skills. OCAW also hosts local chapter conferences and banquets.

References

External links
 Official website

Chinese-American organizations
Asian-American women's organizations
Organizations based in Washington, D.C.
Organizations established in 1977
1977 establishments in the United States